Meltingvatnet is a lake on the border of the municipalities of Indre Fosen and Inderøy in Trøndelag county, Norway. The lake is a reservoir that holds water for the Mosvik power plant. The water flows out of the lake into the Mossa river which flows into the village of Mosvik.

See also
List of lakes in Norway

References

Lakes of Trøndelag
Indre Fosen
Inderøy
Reservoirs in Norway